Americký souboj  is a 1913 Austro-Hungarian comedy film directed by Otakar Štáfl.

Cast
 Ela Laušmanová as Wife's Friend
 Nina Laušmanová as Wife
 Otakar Štáfl as Friend
 Jiří Steimar as Husband
 Max Urban as Friend

External links
 

1913 comedy films
1913 films
Czech black-and-white films
Austrian silent films
Hungarian silent films
Czechoslovak black-and-white films
Hungarian black-and-white films
Austro-Hungarian films